Daniel Weber may refer to:
 Daniel Weber (footballer) (born 1990), Austrian footballer
 Daniel E. Weber (born 1940), American food technologist
 Daniel K. Weber (born 1959), American inventor